Spahići may refer to:

 Spahići, Bosnia and Herzegovina, a village near Bihać
 Spahići, Croatia, a village near Bosiljevo